Uraecha gilva is a species of beetle in the family Cerambycidae. It was described by Yokoyama in 1966.

Subspecies
 Uraecha gilva hachijoensis Hayashi, 1969
 Uraecha gilva gilva Yokoyama, 1966

References

Lamiini
Beetles described in 1966